Aspen Education Group is an American company specializing in providing therapeutic interventions for adolescents and young adults, including wilderness therapy programs, residential treatment centers, therapeutic boarding schools, and weight loss programs. Since November 2006, Aspen Education Group, with corporate offices located in Cerritos, California has been a division of Bain Capital's CRC Health.

History
Aspen Education Group, Inc. was formed in December 1997 as a spin-off of College Health Enterprises. In 1998, Aspen was reported to have annual revenues of $28 million. That same year, the Sprout Group and Frazier Healthcare Ventures of Seattle purchased major interests in the company. In 2002, Aspen obtained an investment of $15 million from Warburg Pincus and $48 million or more in loans from CapitalSource and Caltius Mezzanine. For 2006, it projected revenue of $150 million. In 2005, The New York Times reported that analysts estimated that companies like Aspen had profits between 10 and 20 percent of their revenues.

Programs

Active
Active programs are listed in the table below, sortable by name, type or location. Most programs are members of the National Association of Therapeutic Schools and Programs (NATSAP);  several have additional affiliations, such as the National Association of Therapeutic Wilderness Camping.

Closed

Controversies and criticisms
The Aspen Education Group in 2005 was the target of criticism related to the large revenues its programs generated, and the charge that the provider takes advantage of parents in desperate situations.

In January 2014, Aspen Education Group was accused of "slavery", "abuse", and "false imprisonment" in a lawsuit by the family of a teenage girl who claims she was berated on television by Dr. Phil and then sent to a residential treatment center owned by Aspen where she was falsely imprisoned, filed a civil complaint in federal court. The girl and her mother appeared on the "Dr. Phil" show in February 2013. In the episode, the teen admitted to having sex with adult men she met online, which the family called "bizarre and dangerous conduct" in their lawsuit. To help the family, Dr. Phil then paid for the daughter to enroll at Aspen's Island View Residential Treatment Center. In their suit, the family calls the facility a "private prison" where their daughter was deprived her of freedom, privacy, education, and subjected to "involuntary servitude, and unjust unusual punishments." In one incident, the daughter apparently refused to obey staff members who told her to get off of her bed. When staff members tried to pull her off, her right arm "was badly and perhaps irreparably broken, and its main nerve severely damaged," the lawsuit states. The family also claims the teenage girl's constitutional rights were violated and she was falsely imprisoned, as well as alleging conspiracy and fraud.

In 2009, Oregon state investigators stated that they had found nine cases of abuse and neglect at Mount Bachelor Academy, and the school was ordered to close. Aspen denied the allegations, and after a legal settlement the findings were modified to read that "the agency had reasonable cause to believe that abuse or neglect occurred at the school".

In 2008, a 16-year-old girl enrolled at the Bromley Brook School became involved in a sexual relationship with a teacher. The 40-year-old teacher subsequently pleaded guilty to  sexual exploitation of a minor.

In 2004, a 14-year-old boy died at Aspen's Lone State Expeditions wilderness program. During the program, the boy and his group had hiked several miles in 90-degree weather. In 2006, a wrongful death lawsuit was brought against Aspen Education Group over the incident.  Aspen later settled the case out of court.

In news and popular culture
Several Aspen Educational Group programs have been featured in the media:

 The British TV documentary Britain's Youngest Boozers, broadcast October 25, 2005 featured the Aspen program SUWS of the Carolinas.
 SageWalk (not yet owned by Aspen when aired) was featured in the American version of Brat Camp.
 Turn-About Ranch feature in Season two of the UK version of Brat Camp. 
 Aspen Achievement Academy featured in season three of the UK verison of Brat Camp.
 Aspen Education programs have been featured multiple times on the Dr. Phil show in the United States.
 Passages to Recovery and NorthStar Center were featured on A&E Television Network's documentary series "Intervention".
 Aspen Education Group's programs were called a "carousel of treatment" in an article from Utah NPR

References

External links
Aspen Education Group official website

Bain Capital companies
Cerritos, California
Education companies of the United States
Special schools in the United States